The École Polytechnique is a French grande école founded in 1794 to train students in sciences and technology.

École Polytechnique may also refer to the following schools:

Algeria
National Polytechnic School (Algeria), or École Nationale Polytechnique (ENP), an engineering school in Algiers

Canada 
Polytechnique Montréal (formerly École Polytechnique de Montréal), an engineering school affiliated with the Université de Montréal

France 
École Polytechnique de l'Université de Nantes, a French grande école
Ecole Polytechnique de l'Université d'Orléans, a French engineering school

Switzerland 
École Polytechnique Fédérale de Lausanne, a Swiss research university

See also
 École Polytechnique massacre, a 1989 mass shooting targeting female students of École Polytechnique de Montréal
 L'Ecole Polytechnique Monument, a monument at the United States Military Academy, donated by students from the École Polytechnique
 Polytechnic (disambiguation)